F700 may refers to:
Compaq Presario F700, a notebook computer
Mercedes-Benz F700, a concept car
Samsung SGH-F700, a mobile phone